Charles Dubois is the name of:
Charles Dubois (treasurer) (died 1740), East India Company treasurer and botanist
Charles Frédéric Dubois (1804–1867), Belgian naturalist
Charles-Victor Dubois (1832–1869), Belgian composer and harmonium player
Charles du Bois de Vroylande (1835–1888), Belgian lawyer and politician
Charles Du Bos (1882–1939), French critic
Paul Charles Dubois (1848–1918), Swiss neuropathologist